Iarbhunscoil Oiliféir Naofa (St. Oliver Post Primary School) is a secondary school located in Oldcastle, County Meath, Ireland. A new building was opened in 2002 and the school celebrated its 50th anniversary in 2009, opening four new classrooms on the date. On 3 March 2007 the school won the All-Ireland Vocational Schools Championship Senior Cup 'B' Competition in Gaelic football.

References

External links
 http://www.stoliverpps.ie

Secondary schools in County Meath